The Game of Their Lives (Chollima Football Team) is a 2002 documentary film directed by Daniel Gordon with Nicholas Bonner of Koryo Tours as an associate producer about the seven surviving members of the North Korea national football team who participated in the 1966 FIFA World Cup. Its victory over Italy propelled the North Korean team into the quarterfinal: it was the first time an Asian team had advanced so far in a World Cup.

Awards
2003: Winner, the Royal Television Society award for best sports documentary.
2003: Nominated for Best Historical Documentary at the Grierson Awards.
2003: Nominated for Best Documentary at the British Independent Film Awards.
2003: First prize, Seville Film Festival.
2004: Refracting Reality Documentary Film Award, Seattle International Film Festival, tied with Searching for the Wrong-Eyed Jesus (2003).

See also
 A State of Mind

References

External links

2002 films
British independent films
Documentary films about association football
Documentary films about North Korea
North Korea national football team
Sports films based on actual events
North Korea at the 1966 FIFA World Cup
Italy at the 1966 FIFA World Cup
2000s English-language films
British sports documentary films
2000s British films